Tuite is a surname. Notable people with the surname include:

Aidan Tuite, Irish Gaelic footballer
Gabrielle Tuite (born 1977), American model and actress
Gerry Tuite (1910–1990), Australian rules footballer
Hugh Morgan Tuite (1795–1868), Irish politician
James Tuite (1849–1916), Irish watchmaker and politician
Jerry Tuite (1966–2003), American professional wrestler
Kevin Tuite (born 1954), Irish-Canadian anthropologist
Marjorie Tuite (1922–1986), American Roman Catholic nun and activist
Peter Tuite (born 1976), Irish classical concert pianist and pedagogue

See also
 Tuite baronets, in the baronetage of Ireland